Eternal Fire is a Turkish esports organization founded on 13 August 2021. The organization has teams competing in Counter-Strike: Global Offensive and Valorant.

Counter-Strike 
Eternal Fire's CS:GO team was announced on 13 August 2021, featuring four of the most notable Turkish players in CS:GO history—woxic, ⁠XANTARES⁠, ⁠Calyx⁠, and ⁠imoRR⁠—and one Jordanian player. Two months later, the Jordanian player, ISSAA, left the team and the organization became a fully Turkish roster. The team attended the Antwerp 2022 Major, but did not advance to the playoff stage. In July 2022, ⁠Calyx⁠ left the team and was replaced by MAJ3R. A week later, xfl0ud was moved to the inactive lineup and replaced by Ahmet "paz" Karahoca. The move brought the core of Space Soldiers back together.

After failing to qualify for the IEM Rio Major 2022, MAJ3R was removed from the team in October, while xfl0ud was brought back from inactivity. Later that month, paz requested to be benched due to personal reasons, while coach Canpolat "hardstyle" Yıldıran was removed by the organisation itself. In early November, AWPer Özgür "woxic" Eker also benched himself, stating that he wanted to continue his career in an international team. Calyx and MAJ3R were brought back to fill in, while Sezgin "Fabre" Kalaycı was appointed as the new coach.

Valorant 
The Valorant roster of Eternal Fire was announced on 1 October 2021, which included former Space Soldiers player Çağatay "Despe" Sedef as coach.

Counter-Strike roster

References 

Counter-Strike teams
Esports teams established in 2021
Valorant teams
Esports teams based in Turkey